Ben Cooper (1933–2020) was an American film and television actor.

Ben Cooper may also refer to:

 Ben Cooper (media executive), British radio journalist, presenter and Controller of BBC Radio 1
 Ben Cooper (musician) (born 1982), singer/songwriter from Jacksonville, Florida
 Ben Cooper (rugby league), rugby league footballer of the 1990s, and 2000s
 Ben Cooper (cricketer) (born 1992), Dutch cricketer
 Ben Cooper (politician) (1854–1920), British politician and trade unionist

See also
 Ben Cooper, Inc., a corporation which manufactured Halloween costumes
 Benjamin Cooper, Member of Parliament for Great Yarmouth 1621–24
 Irving Ben Cooper (1902–1996), American judge